Eternally Yours may refer to:

Eternally Yours (film), a 1939 American film directed by Tay Garnett
Eternally Yours, a 2006 short film by Atsushi Ogata
Eternally Yours (album), by the Saints, 1978
"Eternally Yours" (song), by 2 Unlimited, 1991

See also
Eternamente tuya (lit. Eternally Yours), a 2009 Mexican telenovela
Forever Yours (disambiguation)